Dick Kuchen (born June 22, 1944) is an American basketball coach. He served as head coach at University of California, Berkeley from 1978 to 1985. He then served as the head coach at Yale University from 1986 to 1999. Kuchen served as assistant coach with the 1978 Notre Dame Final Four team.

In 2005 Kuchen was inducted into the Rider College Sports Hall of Fame.

References

1944 births
Living people
American men's basketball coaches
American men's basketball players
California Golden Bears men's basketball coaches
Notre Dame Fighting Irish men's basketball coaches
Rider Broncs men's basketball players
Yale Bulldogs men's basketball coaches